USS Clarendon (APA-72) was a Gilliam-class attack transport that served with the United States Navy from 1944 to 1946. She was scrapped in 1964.

History
Clarendon was named after a county in South Carolina. She was launched 12 September 1944 by Consolidated Steel at Wilmington, California, under a Maritime Commission contract; commissioned 14 December 1944; and reported to the Pacific Fleet. Clarendon sailed from San Diego 6 February 1945 to join amphibious exercises in the Hawaiian Islands, then sailed for Ulithi, where late in March she joined the escort of a convoy to voyage to Saipan.

Invasion of Okinawa 
Returning to Ulithi, she put to sea 22 April to carry combat cargo to Okinawa, off which she lay to discharge 26 to 30 April. On the 28th, she drove away enemy aircraft with her intensive gunfire.

Returning to the west coast 22 May 1945, Clarendon made three voyages from San Diego and San Francisco to Pearl Harbor, carrying passengers and cargo in both directions. On 29 July she got underway from San Francisco.

Post-war
Clarendon called at Eniwetok, Ulithi, Manila, and put into Tokyo 13 September. She carried troops for the occupation of Japan and in the redeployment of forces in China until 15 November, when she sailed from Taku to load homeward bound troops at Samar, Guam, Saipan, and Iwo Jima on her way to San Pedro, where she arrived 18 December.

Decommissioning
In January 1946 she sailed north to Seattle, where she was decommissioned 9 April 1946, and transferred to the War Shipping Administration in June 1946. She was scrapped by Zidell, Portland, OR; scrapping completed 16 October 1964.

Decorations
Clarendon received one battle star for World War II service.

References

APA-72 Clarendon, Navsource Online.

 

Gilliam-class attack transports
Transports of the United States Navy
World War II auxiliary ships of the United States
World War II amphibious warfare vessels of the United States
Clarendon County, South Carolina
Ships built in Los Angeles
1944 ships